Words of Old Norse origin have entered the English language, primarily from the contact between Old Norse and Old English during colonisation of eastern and northern England between the mid 9th to the 11th centuries (see also Danelaw). 
Many of these words are part of English core vocabulary, such as egg or knife. 
There are hundreds of such words, and the list below does not aim at completeness.

To be distinguished from loan words which date back to the Old English period are modern Old Norse loans originating in the context of Old Norse philology, such as kenning (1871), and loans from modern Icelandic (such as geyser, 1781).
Yet another class comprises loans from Old Norse into Old French, which via Anglo-Norman were then indirectly loaned into Middle English; an example is flâneur, via French from the Old Norse verb flana "to wander aimlessly".

A
ado influenced by Norse "at" ("to", infinitive marker) which was used with English "do" in certain English dialects
aloft
 á ("=in, on, to") + lopt ("=air, atmosphere, sky, heaven, upper floor, loft")
 English provenance = c 1200 AD
anger
 angr ("=trouble, affliction"); root ang (="strait, straitened, troubled")
 English provenance = c 1250 AD
are merger of Old English (earun, earon) and Old Norse (er) cognates
auk A type of Arctic seabird.
awe
 agi ("=terror")
 English provenance = c 1205 AD (as aȝe, an early form of the word resulting from the influence of Old Norse on an existing Anglo-Saxon form, eȝe)
awkward the first element is from Old Norse ǫfugr ("=turned-backward"), the '-ward' part is from Old English weard
awn From Old Norse ögn
axle May be a combination of Old English eax and Old Norse öxull (="axis")

B
bag baggi
bait beita
band band (="rope")
bark bǫrkr
bash From Old Norse *basca (="to strike")
bask baðask reflex. of baða "bathe" (baðast, baða sig)
berserk berserkr, lit. 'bear-shirt', (alt. berr-serkr, 'bare-shirt') frenzied warriors
billow bylgja
birth byrðr
blather Probably from a Scandinavian source such as Old Norse blaðra (="mutter, wag the tongue")
bleak bleikr (="pale")
blend Possibly from Old Norse blanda (="to mix")
blister From a Scandinavian source via Old French
bloat From a Scandinavian source akin to Old Norse blautr (="soaked, soft from being cooked in liquid")
blunder blundra (="shut one's eye")
boast Probably from a Scandinavian source via Anglo-French
bole From Old Norse bolr (="tree trunk")
both baðir
boon bon (="a petition, prayer")
booth From Old Danish boþ (="temporary dwelling"), from East Norse *boa (="to dwell")
brink Possibly related to Danish brink (="steepness, shore, bank, grassy edge")
brunt Likely from Old Norse brundr (="sexual heat") or bruna =("to advance like wildfire")
bug búkr (="insect within tree trunks")
bulk bulki
bull boli
bump Perhaps from Scandinavian, probably echoic
bur From a Scandinavian source related to Old Norse burst (="bristle")
bylaw bylög ('by'=village; 'lög'=law; 'village-law')

C
cake kaka (="cake")
call kalla (="cry loudly")
cart From Old Norse kartr or a similar Scandinavian source
cast kasta (="to throw")
clip klippa (="to cut")
club klubba (="cudgel")
clumsy From a Scandinavian source akin to Old Norse klumsa (="make speechless, palsy; prevent from speaking")
cog Probably a Scandinavian borrowing, related to Norwegian kugg
cozy Likely of Scandinavian origin via Scots, perhaps related to Norwegian kose seg
crawl krafla (="to claw")
craze Possibly from Old Norse krasa (="shatter") via Old French crasir
creekkriki ("corner, nook") through ME creke ("narrow inlet in a coastline") altered from kryk perhaps influenced by Anglo-Norman crique itself from a Scandinavian source via Norman-French
crook krokr (="hook-shaped instrument or weapon")
cur kurra (="to growl")
cut Possibly from North Germanic*kut-

D
dangle Probably from Scandinavian, related to Danish dangle, Swedish dangla (="to swing about") and Norwegian dangla
dank Related to Swedish dank (="moist place") and dänka (="to moisten")
daze, dazed Perhaps from Old Norse *dasa
die deyja (="pass away")
dirt drit (="feces")
dregs dregg (="sediment")
droop From Old Norse drupa (="to drop, sink, hang (the head)")
dump Possibly related to Danish dumpe (="fall hard"), Norwegian dumpa (="to fall suddenly"), and Old Norse dumpa (="to beat"). Not found in Old English.

E
egg egg (="egg")
eider a type of duck.
equip skipa (="organize, arrange, place in order") through Middle French équiper, from Old French esquiper "fit out a ship, load on board", itself from Norman-French esquipper, eschiper

F
fellow félagi
filly Possibly from Old Norse fylja, fem. of foli (="foal")
firth From Old Norse fjörðr via Scottish
fjord From Norwegian fiord, from Old Norse fjörðr (="an inlet, estuary")
flag Probably from Old Norse flaka (="to flicker, flutter, hang loose")
flaneur flana ("to wander aimlessly") + French suffix -eur through (19th cent.) French flâneur, itself from Norman-French flaner, flanner
flat flatr
flaunt Related to Swedish flankt (="loosely, flutteringly") and flakka (="to waver")
flaw From Old Norse flaga (="stone slab, layer of stone")
fleck Probably from Old Norse flekka (="to spot, stain, cover with spots")
fling Probably from Old Norse flengja
flit flytja (="cause to fit")
floe From Norwegian flo (="layer, slab") from Old Norse flo
flounder From Old Norse flydhra via Anglo-French floundre
fluster Probably from a Scandinavian source related to Icelandic flaustr (="fluster")
fog from Old Norse fok through Danish fog, meaning "spray", "shower", "snowdrift"
fro from Old Norse fra (="from)
freckle freknur (="freckles")

G
gab gabbnna (="to mock") through Northern England dialect, Scottish or Norman-French
gad gaddr (="spike, nail")
gag Perhaps influenced by Old Norse gag-hals (="with head thrown back") 
gait Related to Old Norse gata (="way, road, path")
gale Perhaps from Old Norse gol (="breeze") or Old Danish gal (="bad, furious")
gang gangr (="act of going, a group of men")
gap gap (="chasm")
gape From an unrecorded English word or from Old Norse gapa (="to open the mouth wide, gape")
gasp geispa (="to yawn")
gaunt Perhaps from a Scandinavian source
gawk from Middle English gawen, from Old Norse ga (="to heed")
gear from Old Norse gørvi (="apparel, gear")
geld from Old Norse gelda (="to castrate")
gelding from Old Norse geldingr (="wether; eunuch")
get geta, gat (got), gittan (gotten)
geyser from Icelandic geysir, from Old Norse geysa (="to gush")
gift gift (="dowry")
gill Possibly related to Old Norse gjölnar
girth gjörð (="circumference, cinch")
give gefa (="to give")
glitter glitra (="to glitter")
gloat From a Scandinavian source such as Old Norse glotta (="to grin, smile scornfully and show the teeth")
gosling gæslingr" (="goose")
grovel Shakespearean term originating from Old Norse grufeguest gestr (="guest")
gun from Old Norse Gunnhildr (female name, both elements of the name, gunn and hildr, have the meaning "war, battle")
gust gustr (="gust")

H
haggle haggen (="to chop")
hail heill (="health, prosperity, good luck")
hank Probably from a Scandinavian source such as Old Norse hönk (="a hank, coil")
hap, happy happ (="chance, good luck, fate")
harness From Old Norse *hernest (="provisions for an army") via Old French harnoishaunt heimta (="to bring back home") through Anglo-Norman haunter (="to reside", "to frequent"), (Old) French hanter from Norman hanter. 
haven From Old Norse höfn (="haven, harbor")
hit hitta (="to find")
how (or howe)  haugr (="barrow, small hill") Usage preserved mainly in place names
husband husbondi (="master of the house")
hug Possibly from Old Norse hugga (="to comfort")

I
ill illr (="bad")
irk yrkja (="to work")

J

jökulhlaup from Icelandic jökulhlaup from Old Norse jǫkull and hlaup.
jarl From Old Norse jarlK
kedge Probably from a Scandinavian source or related to "cadge"
keg From a Scandinavian source such as Old Norse kaggi (="keg, cask")
keel kjölrkenning a descriptive phrase used in Germanic poetry
kick Of uncertain origin, perhaps from Old Norse kikna (="bend backwards, sink at the knees")
kid kið (="young goat")
kilt From Middle English kilten, from a Scandinavian source
kindle kyndaknife knífrL
lad ladd (="young man (unlikely)")
lag Possibly from a Scandinavian source, related to Norwegian lagga (="go slowly")
lass From a Scandinavian source related to Old Swedish løsk kona (="unmarried woman") or Old Norse löskr (="idle, weak")
lathe hlaða (="to load")
law *laguleg leggrlemming From Old Norse lomundr via Norwegian lemminglift lypta (="to raise")
likely líkligrlink *hlenkrlitmus litmose (="lichen for dyeing", lita ="to stain")
loan lán (="to lend")
loft lopt (="an upper room or floor : attic, air, sky")
loose lauss (="loose/free")
lope From Old Norse hlaupa (="to run, leap, spring up")
low lagrlug From Scandinavian, related to Swedish lugga and Norwegian lugge (="to pull by the hair")

M
meek From a Scandinavian source such as Old Norse mjukr (='soft, pliant, gentle')
midden Of Scandinavian origin, related to Danish møddingmink From a Scandinavian source, related to Swedish menk (="a stinking animal in Finland")
mire myrr (='bog')
mistake mistaka (="miscarry")
muck myki (="cow dung")
mug muggemuggy mugga (="drizzle, mist")

N
nag Probably ultimately from a Scandinavian source, related to Old Norse gnaga (="to complain," literally "to bite, gnaw")
narwhal From Danish and Norwegian narhval, probably a metathesis of Old Norse nahvalr, literally "corpse-whale," from na "corpse"
nay, naysayer From a Scandinavian source such as Old Norse neiniggard, niggardly Perhaps from a Scandinavian source related to Old Norse *hniggw, possibly via French
Norman, Normandy from Old Norse through Old French, meaning "northman", due to Viking settlement in Normandy region
nudge Perhaps from Scandinavian, related to Norwegian nugge/nyggje (="to jostle, rub") and Icelandic nugga (="to rub, massage")

O
oaf alfr (="elf")
odd oddi (="third number", "the casting vote")
ombudsman from Old Norse umboðsmaðr through Swedish ombudsman, meaning "commissary", "representative", "steward"
outlaw utlagiP
peen Probably from a Scandinavian source, related to Norwegian penn and Old Swedish pænaplough, plow plogrprod From Old Norse broddr (="shaft, spike")

R
race rás (="to race", "to run", "to rush", "to move swift")
raft raptr (="log")
rag Probably from a Scandinavian source such as Old Norse rögg (="shaggy tuft, rough hair")
raise reisaransack rannsaka (="to search the house")
reef Likely from Old Norse rif (="ridge in the sea; reef in a sail") via Dutch rifferegret gráta ("to weep, groan") + French prefix re- through Old French regreter, itself from Old Norman-French regrater, regreter, influenced by Old English grætanreindeer hreindyririd Possibly from Old Norse ryðja (="to clear (land) of obstructions")
rift Related to Old Norse ripa/rifa (=""to tear apart, break a contract")
rig Probably from a Scandinavian source. May be related to Danish/Norwegian rigge (="to equip") and Swedish rigga (="to rig, harness")
rive rífa (="to scratch, plow, tear")
root rótrotten rotinn (="decayed")
rug rogg (="shaggy tuft")
rugged rogg (="shaggy tuft")
rump From a Scandinavian source related to Danish/Norwegian rumpe and Swedish rumpaS
saga saga (="story, tale")
sale salasame same, samr (="same")
scale (for weighing) from skal (="bowl, drinking cup", or in plural "weighing scale" referring to the cup or pan part of a balance) in early English used to mean "cup"
scalp From a Scandinavian source related to Old Norse skalli (="a bald head") or skalpr (="sheath, scabbard")
scant skamt & skammr (="short, lacking")
scare skirra (="to frighten)
scarf skarfr (="fastening joint") ("scarf" and "scarves" have possibly been reintroduced to modern Swedish in their English forms as slang, but Swedes almost always use the compound "neck-cloth" (hals-duk).
scathe skaða (="to hurt, injure")
scoff From a Scandinavian source such as Old Norse skaup, skop (="mockery, ridicule")
scold From Old Norse skald (="poet")
scorch Perhaps from Old Norse skorpna (="to be shriveled"). It was previously thought to be from Old French, but this is now considered unlikely.
score skor (="notch"; "twenty")
scowl Probably from a Scandinavian source, related to Norwegian skule (="look furtively, squint, look embarrassed") and Danish skule (="to scowl, cast down the eyes")
scrag Related to Norwegian skragg "a lean person;" dialectal Swedish skraka "a great, dry tree; a long, lean man," skragge "old and torn thing," Danish skrog "hull of a ship; carcass," Icelandic skröggr, a nickname of the fox
scrap skrap (="scraps, trifles") from skrapa
scrape skrapa (="to scrape, erase")
scrawny Of uncertain origin but probably from a Scandinavian source, such as Old Norse skrælna (="to shrivel")
scree From Old Norse skriða (="landslide")
scuff Probably from a Scandinavian source related to Old Norse skufa, skyfa (="to shove, push aside"), via Scottish
seat sæti (="seat, position")
seem sœma (="to conform")
shrimp Probably from or related to Old Norse skreppa (="thin person")
shrivel Perhaps from a Scandinavian source and related to Swedish skryvla (="to wrinkle, to shrivel")
silt Probably from a Scandinavian source, related to Norwegian and Danish sylt (="salt marsh") and Old Swedish sylta (="mud")
skate skata (="fish")
skerry From Old Norse sker
skewer Possibly from Old Norse skifa (="a cut, slice")
ski From Norwegian ski, related to Old Norse skið (="long snowshoe")
skid Probably from a Scandinavian source akin to Old Norse skið (="stick of wood")
skill skil (="distinction")
skin skinn (="animal hide")
skip skopa (="to skip, run)
skit Perhaps ultimately from Old Norse skjuta (="to shoot, move quickly")
skitter, skittish Perhaps relate to Old Norse skjota
skirt
 skyrta (="shirt")
skive From a Scandinavian source such as Old Norse skifa (="to cut, split")
skrike skríkja (="to scream")
skull skulle (="head")
sky ský (="cloud")
slam From a Scandinavian source, ultimately of imitative origin.
slant sletta, slenta (="to throw carelessly")
slaughter *slahtr (="butchering")
slaver slafra (="slaver")
sledge sleggja (="sledgehammer")
sleight slœgð
sleuth sloð (="trail")
slight Probably from a Scandinavian source akin to Old Norse slettr (="smooth, sleek")
sling From Old Norse slyngva
slob From a Scandinavian source via Irish
slouch Related to Old Norse slokr ("lazy fellow")
slump Probably from a Scandinavian source such as Norwegian and Danish slumpe (="fall upon,") Swedish slumpa; perhaps ultimately of imitative origin.
slush Perhals from a Scandinavian source, related to Norwegian and Danish slask (="slushy ground")
sly sloegr (="cunning, crafty, sly")
smithy From Old Norse smiðja
snag From a Scandinavian source, related Old Norse snagi (="clothes peg")
snare snara (="noose, snare")
snape sneypa (="to outrage, dishonor, disgrace")
snub snubba (="to curse")
snug Perhaps from a Scandinavian source such as Old Norse snoggr (="short-haired")
sprint spretta (="to jump up")
squabble probably from a Scandinavian source and of imitative origin
squall Probably from a Scandinavian source, such as Old Norse skvala (="to cry out")
stack From a Scandinavian source akin to Old Norse stakkr (="haystack")
stagger stakra (="to push")
stain steina (="to paint")
steak steik, steikja (="to fry")
stoup From a Scandinavian source such as Old Norse staup (="cup")
stumble Probably from a Scandinavian source, may be related to Norwegian stumla, Swedish stambla (="to stumble")
swag From a Scandinavian source akin to Old Norse sveggja (="to swing, sway")
sway sveigja (="to bend, swing, give way")

T
tag Probably from a Scandinavian source, related to Norwegian tagg (="point, prong, barb") and Swedish tagg (="prickle, thorn")
tangle From a Scandinavian source, possibly related to Old Norse þongull
take taka
tarn tjǫrn, tjarn
tatter From a Scandinavian source such as Old Norse töturr (="rags, tatters, tattered garment")
teem tœma (="to empty")
tern From a Scandinavian source akin via East Anglian dialect
tether Probably from a Scandinavian source akin to Old Norse tjoðr (="tether")
their þeirra
they þeir
though from Old English þēah, and in part from Old Norse þó (="though")
thrall þræll
thrift þrift (="prosperity")
thrive From a Scandinavian source akin to þrifask (="to thrive", originally "grasp to oneself")
thrust þrysta (="to thrust, force")
thwart þvert (="across")
tidings tíðindi (="news of events")
tight þéttr (="watertight, close in texture, solid")
till til (="to, until")
toft From Old Norse topt (="homestead")
toom tóm (="vacant time, leisure")
toss Of uncertain origin, possibly from a Scandinavian source
trash Perhaps from Old Norse tros (="rubbish, fallen leaves and twigs")
troll troll (="giant, fiend, demon"; further etymology is disputed)
trust (verb) traust (="help, confidence")
tyke From a Scandinavian source akin to Old Norse tik (="bitch")

U
ugly uggligr (="Dreadfull, repulsive")
until from Old Norse und (="as far as, up to") and til (="until, up to")

V
viking vikingr (="one who came from the fjords", vik = small and not deep fjord)
vole Probably from Old Norse völlr (="field")

W
wag Probably from a Scandinavian source related Old Norse vagga (="a cradle")
waif Probably from a Scandinavian source akin to Old Norse veif (="waving thing, flag") via Anglo-French waif
wail From Old Norse væla (="to lament")
wand vondr (="rod")
want vanta (="to lack")
wapentake From Old Norse vapnatak
wassail From Old Norse vas heill (="be healthy")
weak veikr (="weak, pliant")
wheeze Probably from a Scandinavian source such as Old Norse hvoesa (="to hiss")
whirl hvirfla (="to go around")
whisk viska (="to plait")
wicker From a Scandinavian source, related to Danish viger and Middle Swedish viker
wicket vík (="bay") + French suffix -et through Anglo-Norman wicket, itself from Old Norman-French wiket, Norman-French viquet > French guichet
wight vigr (="able in battle") – the other wight meaning "man" is from Old English
wile vél (="trick, craft, fraud")
windlass vindáss (= "windlass", literally "winding-pole"), through Old Norman / Anglo-Norman windas, from vinda ("to wind") + áss ("pole").   
window vindauga (="wind-eye") – although gluggi was more commonly used in Old Norse
wing vængr (="a wing")
wreck From a Scandinavian source akin to Old Norse *wrek (="wreck, flotsam"), via Anglo-Norman wrec
wrong rangr (="crooked, wry, wrong")

Y
yaw Perhaps ultimately from Old Norse jaga

See also
Lists of English words of international origin
List of English words of Scandinavian origin
List of English words of Norwegian origin
List of English words of Danish origin
List of English words of Swedish origin
Old Norse language
Old Norse orthography

Notes

References

External links

Babbel.com - 139 Old Norse words that invaded the English language
English-Old Norse dictionary
Merriam-Webster Online Dictionary
Online Etymology dictionary
Oxford English Dictionary, 2nd Edition (1989)
 Wiktionary
 Old Norse loans in Old and Middle English, and their legacy in the dialects of England and modern standard English

Old Norse
Old Norse
Anglo-Norse England